Warner McBride (born December 4, 1956) is an American politician who served in the Mississippi House of Representatives from the 10th district from 1993 to 2012.

References

1956 births
Living people
Democratic Party members of the Mississippi House of Representatives